Phase Equilibria Diagrams can refer to:

Phase diagrams in equilibrium
Phase Equilibria Diagrams, a database for glass; see Glass databases